Surbhi Javeri Vyas is an Indian actress and model, known mononymously as Surabhi, who predominantly worked in South Indian films. She started her career in 1993 with Malayalam film Chenkol and then mainly worked on Telugu films. She is currently working as a Gujarati Theatre artist and a television actress in Hindi serials. Some of her better known works include Chenkol and Palnati Pourusham.

Personal life
Surbhi Javeri is married to Dharmesh Vyas, a Gujarati actor and an assistant director  with whom she shared the stage in a number of Gujarati plays like Aaradhna, Rupiyo Nach Nachave, Tamara Bhai Fulltoo Fatak, Bhale Padharya  and Pachi Kaheta Nahi Ke Kahyu Nahotu.

A Gujarati television reality show called Premno Prime Time produced by film actor and producer Kamlesh Oza was nearly based on their real life journey.

Filmography

Television

References

External links
 

Actresses in Hindi cinema
Actresses in Telugu cinema
Actresses from Mumbai
Female models from Mumbai
Living people
Indian film actresses
Actresses in Malayalam cinema
Actresses in Kannada cinema
21st-century Indian actresses
Year of birth missing (living people)
Actresses in Hindi television
Indian television actresses
20th-century Indian actresses